The World Beer Cup is an international beer competition organized by the Brewers Association, a trade group representing America's small and independent craft brewers. It is the largest competition in the beer industry and has been described as "the Olympics of beer." According to americancraftbeer.com, "Winning a World Beer Cup is like winning a Grammy or an Oscar…it brings the world’s attention to even the smallest brewery’s doorstep…and like a hit song or film, it can make a career." The cup was founded by Association of Brewers president Charlie Papazian in 1996 and is awarded every two years. The competition is held in conjunction with the Craft Brewers Conference & BrewExpo America.

Competition and judging 
According to the World Beer Cup, "all entries must be commercially available, fermented malt beverages, conforming to the trade understanding of “beer”, brewed by a permitted commercial brewery. “Commercially available” means available for sale at retail at the time of registration." For the 2016 World Beer Cup, the entry fee was $160 per beer, in addition to a $160 application fee.

Awards are given in more than 100 categories. Up to three awards - gold, silver, and bronze - may be awarded in any category, but sometimes not all three awards are given, depending on how the judges evaluate the entires. If they determine that no beer qualifies for a gold award, they may give out just silver and bronze medals. They may even give no awards at all, if all the entries are determined to be unsuited to the style of that category or to be unworthy of an award.

Recent World Beer Cup events
In 2016 there were 6,596 beers from 1,907 breweries from 55 countries. Entries were judged by an international panel of 253 judges from 31 countries. In 2018 there were 8,234 beers entered, a 25% increase over the 2016 cup and the largest field in the competition's history, with competitors from 66 countries. There were 295 judges, three-fourths of them from outside the United States.

Brewery awards

Champion Brewery (Very Small)

Champion Brewery (Small)

Champion Brewery (Medium)

Champion Brewery (Large)

Champion Brewpub (Small)

Champion Brewpub (Large)

References

External links
 

Beer awards
Recurring events established in 1996
Awards established in 1996